Brachodes orientalis is a moth of the family Brachodidae. It is found in Turkey.

References

Moths described in 1905
Brachodidae
Moths of Asia